Thakoon Panichgul (born in Nakhon Phanom Province, Thailand) is a Thai-American fashion designer.

Biography
Panichgul moved to the United States with his family when he was 11 years old. He grew up in Bellevue, a town outside Omaha, Nebraska.

Panichgul attended Bellevue West High School, where he was a DECA member, attending the international DECA conference in 1993 in Orlando, Florida. After graduating from Boston University in 1997 with a business degree, he moved to New York City.

Career 
In 2000, Panichgul started his fashion career in writing at Harper's Bazaar working as an associate features editor. As a fashion writer, Panichgul developed an interest in designing, and eventually pursued formal studies at Parsons School of Design from 2001 to 2003.

In September 2004, Panichgul produced his first ready-to-wear collection and became recognized by fashion press, editors and stylists, as well as celebrities like Rachel Bilson, Demi Moore, Michelle Obama, and Sarah Jessica Parker. In 2007 he produced a fashion line for The Gap after being singled out by Anna Wintour of Vogue Magazine, as chronicled in the 2009 American documentary film, The September Issue.  His clothing has been worn by U.S. first lady Michelle Obama, who wore a floral dress by Panichgul on the evening her husband, Barack Obama, accepted the 2008 Democratic nomination for president. He produced a well-received limited-edition clothing line at Target in early 2009.

In 2017, Panichgul decided to take a step back and think about the fashion landscape. He realized that elevated design is not a luxury; it belongs in every woman's wardrobe. In September 2019, Panichgul launched a direct-to-consumer line on THAKOON.com.  His new start-up site aimed to create comfortable clothing from a luxury designer perspective. Panichgul was also the force behind the creative platform HommeGirls: a magazine and retail site that celebrated menswear and tomboy style and culture among women.  It was launched via Instagram in March 2019 with images of menswear-inspired fashion.

Panichgul also collaborates with jewelry company Tasaki.

References

External links
Official website

New York magazine profile
Teen Vogue magazine profile

Living people
1974 births
Thakoon Panichgul
American fashion designers
Parsons School of Design alumni
Thai emigrants to the United States
Thakoon Panichgul
Artists from Omaha, Nebraska
People from Bellevue, Nebraska
People from Sarpy County, Nebraska